Jetty Road may refer to:

Jetty Road (band)
Jetty Road, Glenelg